The Battle of Radom was fought on February 2, 1656 as part of the Second Northern War, between forces of the Polish–Lithuanian Commonwealth commanded by Sandomierski on one side, and on the other Swedish forces commanded by Rutger von Ascheberg. Swedish forces won the battle.

References

Conflicts in 1656
1656 in Poland
Radom
Radom (1656)
Radom (1656)